Joan-Carol Henning better known as JC Henning, is an American film, television and voice actress. She has appeared in several film and television projects and has appeared on stage productions. She has also voiced in several English dubs for Japanese anime. Since 2000, she has been an Audio Describer of live theatre and opera for blind and visually impaired theatre patrons.  She has been credited as Joan-Carol O'Connell and Joan-Carol Kent.

Filmography

Film roles

Television roles

Voice Roles
 Armitage III - Jessup's Associate
 Cybuster - Safine
 D.N.A. Sights 999.9 - Mello
 Doomed Megalopolis - Yukari
 Kyo Kara Maoh! - Susanna Julia von Wincott
 Lily C.A.T. - Dorothy
 The Castle of Cagliostro - Clarisse d'Cagliostro (Streamline dub)
 Space Adventure Cobra: The Movie - Lady Armoroid
 The Fantastic Adventures of Unico - Narrator

External links

Living people
American film actresses
American television actresses
American voice actresses
Year of birth missing (living people)
21st-century American women